6 Pieces of Silver is a studio album by jazz pianist Horace Silver released on the Blue Note label in 1957 featuring performances by Silver with Donald Byrd, Hank Mobley, Doug Watkins and Louis Hayes. The Allmusic review by Scott Yanow awarded the album 4½ stars and states "The early Silver quintet was essentially The Jazz Messengers of the year before but already the band was starting to develop a sound of its own. "Señor Blues" officially put Horace Silver on the map". The front cover photograph was taken at Central Park West, Upper West Side.

Track listing

Personnel
Horace Silver – piano
Donald Byrd – trumpet (tracks 1, 3-6 & 8-10)
Hank Mobley – tenor saxophone (tracks 1, 3-6 & 8)
Junior Cook – tenor saxophone (tracks 9 & 10)
Doug Watkins – bass (tracks 1-8)
Gene Taylor – bass (tracks (tracks 9 & 10)
Louis Hayes – drums 
Bill Henderson – vocals (track 10)

References

Horace Silver albums
1957 albums
Blue Note Records albums
Albums produced by Alfred Lion
Albums recorded at Van Gelder Studio